Mitchell Clisby (born 5 January 1990) is an Australian rules footballer who played with the Melbourne Football Club in the Australian Football League (AFL). He was recruited by the club from North Adelaide in the 2013 Rookie Draft, with pick number 19. Clisby made his debut in round 13, 2013, against  at the Melbourne Cricket Ground. He played eight games for Melbourne in his debut season, but in 2014 was not selected for a single senior match and was subsequently delisted at season's end.

In February 2015, Clisby was given a short-term contract by Essendon to play in the 2015 NAB Challenge as a "top-up" player, due to 26 Essendon players withdrawing from the NAB Challenge because of the ongoing Essendon Football Club supplements controversy.

Statistics

|- style="background-color: #EAEAEA"
! scope="row" style="text-align:center" | 2013
|style="text-align:center;"|
| 50 || 8 || 1 || 3 || 86 || 64 || 150 || 34 || 18 || 0.1 || 0.4 || 10.8 || 8.0 || 18.8 || 4.3 || 2.3
|-
! scope="row" style="text-align:center" | 2014
|style="text-align:center;"|
| 15 || 0 || — || — || — || — || — || — || — || — || — || — || — || — || — || —
|- class="sortbottom"
! colspan=3| Career
! 8
! 1
! 3
! 86
! 64
! 150
! 34
! 18
! 0.1
! 0.4
! 10.8
! 8.0
! 18.8
! 4.3
! 2.3
|}

References

External links

1990 births
Living people
Melbourne Football Club players
Australian rules footballers from South Australia
North Adelaide Football Club players
Casey Demons players